Channel Zero is a graphic novel by Brian Wood and Becky Cloonan set in a near-future New York City.

The character Jennie 2.5 also appears in Wood's The Couriers.

Publication history
Channel Zero was first published by Image Comics in 1997 as a serial before being collected as a standalone work by AiT/Planet Lar in 2000. In 2002, Public Domain: A Channel Zero design book was released, and a sequel, Channel Zero: Jennie One, appeared a year later.  The book is currently published by Dark Horse Comics in omnibus format.

Synopsis
The story focuses on Jennie 2.5, a hacker who uses an illegal television channel to urge viewers to fight back against New York and America's violent theocracy.

Reception
Matthew Shaer of The Village Voice described the work as reminiscent of William Gibson, while Keith Giles of Comic Book Resources declared that the novel "established [Wood] early on as a talented artist and writer to keep an eye on".

References

External links 
 Channel Zero at Brianwood.com

Cyberpunk comics
Image Comics graphic novels
Comics by Brian Wood (comics)
Comics set in New York City